Zygmunt Kamiński (22 February 1933 in Bełżyce – 1 May 2010 in Szczecin) was the archbishop of the Roman Catholic Archdiocese of Szczecin-Kamień, Poland.

Ordained priest on 22 December 1956, Kamiński was named auxiliary bishop of the Roman Catholic Archdiocese of Lublin on 28 October 1975 and was consecrated on 30 November 1975. He eventually became bishop of the Roman Catholic Diocese of Płock and in 1999 was appointed archbishop of the Szczecin-Kamień Archdiocese, retiring on 21 February 2009.

Notes

1933 births
2010 deaths
People from Lublin County
21st-century Roman Catholic archbishops in Poland
Bishops of Płock
20th-century Roman Catholic bishops in Poland
Clergy from Szczecin